Trichophaea hemisphaerioides is a species of apothecial fungus belonging to the family Pyronemataceae. This is a European species which appears as whitish cups with brown hairs on the margin and outer surface, up to 1.5 cm across on recently burned ground, often amongst mosses such as Funaria.

References

Pyronemataceae
Fungi described in 1897